Northern Seminary is a Baptist Christian seminary in Lisle, Illinois. It is affiliated with the American Baptist Churches USA. Its president is William D. Shiell.

History
The Seminary was founded in 1913 by the Second Baptist Church of Chicago under the name Northern Baptist Theological Seminary as a theologically conservative alternative within the framework of its association with the American Baptist Churches USA (Northern Baptist Convention).   In 1920 a collegiate department was founded, and the Northern Baptist Convention became a seminary partner.  In 1963, it moved to Lombard, Illinois.  In 2004, it was renamed Northern Seminary.  In 2017, it moved to Lisle, Illinois. 

It is accredited by the Association of Theological Schools in the United States and Canada.

Noted alumni
David Breese - noted evangelist, author, and radio broadcaster
Carl Henry - founder and first editor of Christianity Today
Torrey Johnson - first president of Youth for Christ
 Tara Beth Leach - pastor and author
John Osteen - first pastor of Lakewood Church in Houston, Texas, US
Kenneth N. Taylor - creator of The Living Bible paraphrase and founder of Tyndale House publishers*
Warren W. Wiersbe - author, teacher and minister, former pastor of Moody Memorial Church, Chicago, Illinois
Clay Evans (pastor) - influential 20th-century African-American evangelical pastor in Chicago.
Millard Erickson - 20th-century theologian and author
Derwin Gray - Former NFL player and pastor of Transformation Church

References

External links

 
1913 establishments in Illinois
Educational institutions established in 1913
Lisle, Illinois
Seminaries and theological colleges in Illinois
Seminaries and theological colleges affiliated with the American Baptist Churches USA
Universities and colleges in Chicago
Universities and colleges in DuPage County, Illinois